The 1993–94 Scottish Premier Division season began on 7 August 1993 and was the last season of the twelve-team league, with three teams relegated to make way for the ten-team league the following season. It was also the final season with the rule of awarding two points for a win, with three points given from then on.

Overview
The 1993–94 Scottish Premier Division season ended in success for Rangers who won the title by three points from nearest rivals Aberdeen to clinch six titles in a row. St Johnstone, Raith Rovers and Dundee were relegated to the First Division after finishing in the bottom three positions. As champions, Rangers qualified for the Champions League while Aberdeen were joined by third-placed Motherwell in qualifying for the UEFA Cup. Sixth-placed Dundee United qualified for the Cup Winners' Cup after winning the Scottish Cup for the first time.

Clubs

Promotion and relegation from 1992–93
Promoted from First Division to Premier League
Raith Rovers
Kilmarnock

Relegated from Premier Division to First Division
Falkirk
Airdrieonians

Stadia and locations

Managers

Managerial changes

League table

Results

Matches 1–22
During matches 1-22 each team plays every other team twice (home and away).

Matches 23–44
During matches 23-44 each team plays every other team twice (home and away).

See also
1993–94 in Scottish football
1993–94 Dundee United F.C. season
1993–94 Rangers F.C. season
Nine in a row

References

Scottish Premier Division seasons
Scot
1993–94 Scottish Football League